Gravedona was a comune of Como Province, Italy. It merged into Gravedona ed Uniti.

References

Cities and towns in Lombardy